Diego Mauricio Quintanilla Ribadeneira (born February 2, 1991) is an Ecuadorian footballer who plays for Alianza Cotopaxi. A product of LDU Qutio's youth system, he earned his first senior cap on June 12, 2010 in the clasico capitalino against crosstown-rival Deportivo Quito.

Honors
LDU Quito
Serie A: 2010

References

External links
FEF card 

1991 births
Living people
Footballers from Quito
Association football midfielders
Ecuadorian footballers
L.D.U. Quito footballers
S.D. Aucas footballers
C.D. ESPOLI footballers